Little Johnny C is an album by American trumpeter Johnny Coles recorded in 1963 and released on the Blue Note label.

Reception
The Allmusic review by Scott Yanow awarded the album 4½ stars and stated "The typically impressive Blue Note lineup handles the obscure material with creative invention".

Track listing
All compositions by Duke Pearson except as indicated
 "Little Johnny C" - 5:12
 "Hobo Joe" (Joe Henderson) - 8:15
 "Jano" - 7:24
 "My Secret Passion" - 7:11
 "Heavy Legs" - 6:01
 "So Sweet My Little Girl" - 6:26

Personnel
Johnny Coles - trumpet
Leo Wright - alto saxophone, flute
Joe Henderson - tenor saxophone
Duke Pearson - piano
Bob Cranshaw - bass
Pete La Roca (tracks 4-6), Walter Perkins (tracks 1-3) - drums

References

Blue Note Records albums
Johnny Coles albums
1964 albums
Albums recorded at Van Gelder Studio
Albums produced by Alfred Lion